Renteria, also known as Rentería, is a Spanish last name, derived from Errenteria. Notable people with the name include:

People

Sports people
 Delio Gamboa Rentería (born 1936), Colombian soccer player
 Rick Renteria (born 1961), American baseball coach
 Édgar Rentería (born 1975), Colombian baseball player
 Alvin Rentería (born 1978), Colombian athlete
 Emilio Rentería (born 1984), Venezuelan soccer player
 Wason Rentería (born 1985), Colombian soccer player
 Carlos Rentería (born 1986), Colombian soccer player
 Jackeline Rentería (born 1986), Colombian wrestler
 Luis Rentería (born 1988), Panamanian soccer player
 Andrés Rentería (born 1993), Colombian soccer player

Other people
 Steven "Schmee" Renteria (born 1981), Chicano restaurant & bar personality and consultant
 Amanda Renteria (born 1974), American political figure
 Carlos Alberto Rentería Mantilla (born 1945), Colombian criminal
 Drago Renteria (born 1967), Chicano transgender writer and activist
 José de Jesús Castillo Rentería (1927–2013), Mexican bishop
 Oscar Renteria, American viticulturalist

Spanish-language surnames